Nyzhniohirskyi (until 1944, Seyitler) is an urban-type settlement in the Autonomous Republic of Crimea, a territory recognized by a majority of countries as part of Ukraine and occupied by Russia as the Republic of Crimea. The town also serves as the administrative center of the Nyzhnohirskyi Raion (district), housing the district's local administration buildings.

As of the 2001 Ukrainian Census, its population was 10,534. Current population:

References

External links
 The murder of the Jews of Nyzhnohirskyi during World War II, at Yad Vashem website.

Urban-type settlements in Crimea
Nyzhniohirskyi Raion
Holocaust locations in Ukraine